The NWA/ECCW Tag Team Championship is the tag team title for the Elite Canadian Championship Wrestling wrestling promotion based out of British Columbia.  It was activated in 1996.  The first champions were the Glamour Order Of Discipline.  There have been 74 reigns by 34 teams and 55 wrestlers with three vacancies.  One of the vacancies came when the titles were vacated by NWA Pacific Northwest representative Mike Sweetster after ruling that the 24 July 2009 match was not an official contest and was thus null and void. The titles are currently being held by Bishy Wishy (Bishop and Fergie) who are in their first reign. On 19 April 2013, ECCW unveiled new belts for the Elite Tag Team Championships. Then champions Scotty Mac and Jamie Diaz relinquished the old NWA/ECCW Tag Team Championships to their stable mates The Greedfather and Red Dinero to have, who later deemed them the "ECCW Classic Tag Team Championships".

Title history

Combined reigns

By team

By wrestler

See also
Elite Canadian Championship Wrestling
National Wrestling Alliance
NWA Canadian Tag Team Championship
NWA Canadian Open Tag Team Championship
NWA Canadian Tag Team Championship (Calgary version)
NWA Canadian Tag Team Championship (Vancouver version)

References

External links
 ECCW Tag Team Championship
ECCW.com - ECCW Tag Team Championship History
Solie.org - ECCW Tag Team Championship History

National Wrestling Alliance championships
Tag team wrestling championships
Regional professional wrestling championships
Elite Canadian Championship Wrestling championships